A close-mid vowel (also mid-close vowel, high-mid vowel, mid-high vowel or half-close vowel) is any in a class of vowel sound used in some spoken languages. The defining characteristic of a close-mid vowel is that the tongue is positioned one third of the way from a close vowel to an open vowel.

Partial list
The close-mid vowels that have dedicated symbols in the International Phonetic Alphabet are:

 close-mid front unrounded vowel 
 close-mid front rounded vowel 
 close-mid central unrounded vowel  (older publications may use )
 close-mid central rounded vowel  (older publications may use )
 close-mid back unrounded vowel 
 close-mid back rounded vowel 

Other close-mid vowels can be indicated with diacritics of relative articulation applied to letters for neighboring vowels.

References 

Vowels by height